The 3rd constituency of Lot-et-Garonne (French: Troisième circonscription de Lot-et-Garonne) is a French legislative constituency in the Lot-et-Garonne département. Like the other 576 French constituencies, it elects one MP using a two round electoral system.

Description
The 3rd Constituency of Lot-et-Garonne covers the north east portion of the Department.

Politically since 1988 the seat has swung between the mainstream left and right broadly in line with the national trend. A By-election was held in the seat in 2013 following the resignation of Jérôme Cahuzac as a result of a scandal regarding his ownership of secret bank accounts as revealed by the Panama Papers.

In common with the other two seats in Lot-et-Garonne it voted for the En Marche candidate at the 2017 election. That election featured a strong performance by the National Front whereby their candidate secured 2nd place in the 1st round of voting and nearly 40% in the run off.

Assembly members

Election results

2022

 
 
 
 
 
 
 
 
 
|-
| colspan="8" bgcolor="#E9E9E9"|
|-
 
 

 
 
 
 
 

* MoDem dissident

2017

 
 
 
 
 
 
 
|-
| colspan="8" bgcolor="#E9E9E9"|
|-

2012

References

3